Boy's Life is a 1991 novel by New York Times bestselling author Robert R. McCammon.  It received the World Fantasy Award for Best Novel in 1992.

The story is set in the early 1960s and makes observations about changes in America at that time, with particular emphasis on the Civil Rights Movement. Several of the characters are connected to the Ku Klux Klan, and the segregation of the black community is dealt with in some detail.

Synopsis
The book deals with 12-year-old Cory Mackenson, who grows up in the town of Zephyr, Alabama. The story begins as Cory's father, Tom, takes Cory on his daily milk route one morning, and while driving by Saxon's Lake (an old quarry filled with water) he watches a car drive straight into the lake and sink to the bottom with a dead man inside, beaten viciously, and his only identification is a tattoo of a skull with wings sprouting from the head. Tom jumps in and tries to save the driver of the car, only to discover that the man is actually a murder victim, handcuffed to the steering wheel. He cannot save him, and the car plummets three hundred feet down to the bottom of the lake. This vision, and the realization that there is evil in the small town of Zephyr, is enough to haunt Cory's father.  Throughout the novel Cory's father is haunted by this image in his dreams. Cory is a writer and throughout the book he writes many stories, and goes on many adventures in his hometown including helping a young boy through a flood, facing the town beast, spending a horrid week with his grandfather, exposing two KKK members, thwarting a racist plot, letting loose an abused rhinoceros, and witnessing a gunfight against the town mob. He also tries to find out who killed the man at Saxon's Lake. In the end it is a German Nazi, an escaped war criminal, who posed as the town veterinarian and had recently took care of Cory's dog Rebel, who eventually died. Dr. Lezander, a.k.a. Gunther Dehninaderke, was a former Nazi officer in charge of physical examinations at a concentration camp in Germany. After revealing his true identity to Cory, he kidnaps Cory and tries to leave town, only to drive off of Route Ten into Saxon's Lake, where he does save Cory's life and sacrifices his own. He drowns, sinking to the bottom near where the man he murdered did. In the epilogue, 27 or so years later, Cory, who has since become a big city writer and married a woman named Sandy, and also had a tomboy of a daughter named Skye, comes back to what is left of Zephyr, which shows many characters have left or died. He finds most of his hometown in shambles, but then finds the town mansion has become an orphanage for boys, and some of the town's members have moved in to help the young boys. The book ends when Cory goes in to see them all again.

Characters
Cory Mackenson— A 12-year-old boy who loves to write, making his stories on paper show life the way it is. The truth, as he says. He believes in juvenile magics, the moments you cherish as an adult and wish you could have back. His troubles begin when he witnesses a murder, the only clue being a green feather he finds at the scene, and a person he sees in the shadows. Throughout the book, he struggles with death, bullies, and everything in between.

Tom Mackenson— Cory's father, a quiet and kind-hearted man, who loses his job as a milkman and has to work at a super market. His one desire in life is peace from his nightmares and thoughts, from which he can't escape after witnessing a murder, seemingly an unsolvable one. He learns to find his peace at Cory's suggestion.

Davy Ray Callan— Cory's hot-headed, sarcastic friend who dies towards the end of the story by shooting himself accidentally. The explanation he gives Cory is that he saw Snowdown, the local myth, which is a white stag no hunter can bag. Davy explains that when he saw Snowdown, he was so shocked he tripped and shot himself in the stomach.

Ben Sears— Cory's chubby, somewhat slow friend, who turns out to be braver than Cory thought. Cory realizes, during a sleepover, that Ben's father is a violent alcoholic, though Ben has never mentioned it.

Johnny Wilson— A soft-spoken, part-Native American friend of Cory's who gets a severe concussion when fighting with the Branlin brothers, the local bullies. Cory worries about him throughout the summer, but Johnny teaches Cory a lesson when there is another confrontation with the Branlins. Johnny uses fighting skills and strength he had worked on all summer to defeat the Branlins. Cory realizes that it takes courage and hard work to earn peace.

Dr. Lezander— The local veterinarian who pretends to be a Dutch survivor of World War II. He is friendly and gives nicknames to the town's residents at weekly church services. His outward appearance hides sinister secrets. In the final chapter, it is revealed that his real name is Gunther Dahninaderke and he is actually a former Nazi, who was the doctor of Esterwegen concentration camp in World War II.

Rebel— Cory's dog that gets hit by a car and  dies, but Cory prays him back to life. Cory slowly realizes that he has to let Rebel die so his dog can find rest.

Vernon Thaxter— The middle-aged son of the richest man in town, Vernon Thaxter refuses to wear clothes. He is crazy in some ways, yet makes predictions that are important to the solving of the murder. He is good-hearted in general, coercing even the most racist people in Zephyr to help build a dam in Bruton, the place where all the black citizens live, against a coming flood. He, like Cory, is a writer, but his writing disappointed his father, who in turn blamed Vernon for his mother's death. Vernon's father may or may not be dead during the story, but this is never proven.

The Lady— The Lady is the undisputed leader of Bruton, and is well respected by almost everyone in Zephyr. White people tend to fear her, including Tom Mackenson. She is very in touch with the supernatural, such as Ol' Moses, the huge creature in the river, and spirits of the dead. She gives Cory his bike, Rocket, as thanks for saving a young boy from Ol' Moses during the flood.

The Moon Man— The Lady's mysterious husband, known to all as the Moon Man, is black but has a very pale birthmark (hinted to be vitiligo) on his face and head that give him a very unusual appearance. He is generally a soft-spoken gentleman.

Dick Moultry— Moultry is an obese, cowardly, angry, self-centered KKK member. Ironically, he is caught under a bomb that is mysteriously, "mistakenly" dropped in Zephyr on Christmas Eve, and which Cory attributes to the Lady's supernatural power. The bomb does not go off, but pins Moultry in his basement. He needs the help of Mr. Lightfoot, the local fix-it man who has a prodigious ability with all machines, to get out from under it. He refuses Mr. Lightfoot's help at first, on the grounds that Mr. Lightfoot is black. He had helped to place a bomb meant to destroy Bruton's civil rights museum.

Mr. Hargison— The local mailman, who saves Cory and his friends during the first fight with the Branlins. He is friendly with Tom Mackenson until they discuss the matter of the KKK, which Hargison secretly belongs to.  He had also assisted in setting the bomb in the mailbox in front of the museum.

The Blaylocks— A violent family of criminals, who use fear and money to stay out of jail.

The Demon— A girl in Cory's class who disgusts the other students with her nose-picking, etc., but wins their respect at the end when she glues Leatherlungs, their tyrannical teacher, to her chair.

Mayor Swope— The mayor of Zephyr who Cory suspects of the murder. He also oversees the local short-story contest.

Judith Harper (a.k.a. Leatherlungs)— One of Cory's teachers, who is considered to be half-crazy and a "burnout" by the other teachers. She bullies Cory, specifically for his trouble in math, and at one point he gets so angry that he hits her. At the end, she gets what she deserves when the Demon glues her (with very strong, homemade glue) to her chair.

Mrs. Neville— Cory's teacher in the beginning of the book, who encourages him to enter a short-story contest. Cory resents her, simply because she is a teacher, but finds out later that she was dying of cancer at the end of the year. She passes away during the summer.

Reverend Blesset— A very right-wing Baptist preacher, who strongly opposes the Beach Boys and their music. He gives a sermon saying that their music is from the devil, is trying to make children sexually crazed, and encourages delinquents. He illustrates this point with an angry spider monkey, whom he calls Lucifer, but this backfires when Lucifer escapes and proceeds to wreak havoc on the town.

The Branlins— Two brothers, Gotha and Gordo, who bully children in the town. Eventually Johnny and Cory fight back, and win peace for the kids of Zephyr.

References

1991 novels
American magic realism novels
American mystery novels
Fiction set in the 1960s
Novels set in Alabama
World Fantasy Award for Best Novel-winning works